Juan Tizol Martínez (22 January 1900 – 23 April 1984) was a Puerto Rican jazz trombonist and composer. He is best known as a member of Duke Ellington's big band, and as the writer of the jazz standards "Caravan", "Pyramid", and "Perdido".

Biography
Tizol was born in Vega Baja, Puerto Rico.  Music was a large part of his life from an early age. His first instrument was the violin, but he soon switched to valve trombone, the instrument he played throughout his career.  His musical training came mostly from his uncle Manuel Tizol, who was the director of the municipal band and the symphony in San Juan.  Throughout his youth, Tizol played in his uncle's band and also gained experience by playing in local operas, ballets and dance bands. In 1920, Tizol joined a band that was traveling to the United States to work in Washington, D.C. The group eventually made it to Washington (traveling as stowaways) and established residence at the Howard Theater, where they played for touring shows and silent movies. At the Howard they also were hired to play in small jazz or dance groups. This is where Tizol first came in contact with Duke Ellington.	

Tizol joined Ellington's band in mid-1929.  Arthur Whetsel, a trumpeter with whom Tizol played in the White Brothers' Band, made the recommendation. Tizol sat beside Tricky Sam Nanton in the two-man trombone section, and became the fifth voice in the brass section of Ellington's orchestra. This opened up new possibilities for Ellington's writing, as he now could write for trombones as a section instead of just having them play with the trumpets. Tizol's rich, warm tone also blended pleasingly with the saxophone section, so he was often scored carrying the lead melody with the saxes.  Along with his distinctive sound, Tizol was also known for being one of the best sight-readers and overall musicians in the band. He played with great accuracy and was considered to be the solid rock of the trombone section. He was not a major improviser in the band, but he was often featured playing written out solos that displayed his masterful technique and agility on the horn.

Tizol made many contributions to the Ellington band throughout the 1930s and 1940s. One of his major roles in the band was copying parts from Ellington's scores. Tizol spent time extracting parts that needed to be written out for upcoming shows.  Besides copying, Tizol was also a band composer. His best-known compositions, "Caravan" (1936) and "Perdido" (1941), are jazz standards. Mercer Ellington stated that Tizol had invented the melody to "Caravan", from his days studying music in Puerto Rico; where they could not afford much sheet music so the teacher turned the music upside down after they had learned to play it right-side up. This technique became known as 'inverting'. Tizol was responsible for bringing Latin influences into the Ellington band with compositions such as "Moonlight Fiesta", "Jubilesta", "Conga Brava", and others.  He also played valide trombone.

Tizol left Ellington's band in 1944 to play in the Harry James Orchestra. The main reason for this was to allow him to spend more time with his wife, who lived in Los Angeles. In  1951, he returned to Ellington, along with James's drummer and alto saxophonist, in what became known as 'the James raid'. However, he returned to James' band in 1953 and remained predominantly on the West Coast for the remainder of his career. In Los Angeles, he played sporadically with Harry James, Nelson Riddle, Louis Bellson and on the Nat "King" Cole's television show. Tizol returned very briefly to Ellington's band in the early 1960s, but eventually retired in Los Angeles. He died of a heart attack at the age of 84 on April 23, 1984 in Inglewood, California, two years after the death of his wife, Rosebud.

Discography

As sideman
With Louis Bellson
 Journey Into Love (Norgran, 1954)
 Drumorama! (Verve, 1957)
 Music, Romance and Especially Love (Verve, 1957)
 The Brilliant Bellson Sound (Verve, 1960)
 Louis Bellson Swings Jule Styne (Verve, 1960)
 Live in Stereo June 28, 1959 at the Flamingo Hotel Vol. 1 (Jazz Hour, 1992)

With Duke Ellington
 Ellington Uptown (Columbia, 1951)
 Ellington '55 (Capitol, 1954)
 Seattle Concert (RCA Victor, 1954)
 Ellington Showcase (Capitol, 1956)
 Liberian Suite and a Tone Parallel to Harlem (Columbia, 1956)
 Piano in the Background (Columbia, 1960)
 Selections from Peer Gynt Suites Nos. 1 & 2 and Suite Thursday (Columbia, 1960)
 The Nutcracker Suite (Columbia, 1960)
 Paris Blues (United Artists, 1961)

With Harry James
 Dancing in Person with Harry James at the Hollywood Palladium (Columbia, 1954)
 Soft Lights, Sweet Trumpet (Columbia, 1954)
 Harry James in Hi-fi (Capitol, 1955)
 Jazz Session (Columbia, 1955)
 Juke Box Jamboree (Columbia, 1955)
 More Harry James in Hi-fi (Capitol, 1956)
 Requests On-the-Road (MGM, 1962)

With others
 Count Basie, First Time! The Count Meets the Duke (Columbia, 1962)
 Benny Carter, Cosmopolite (Norgran, 1954)
 Nat King Cole, After Midnight (Capitol, 1956)
 Nat King Cole, The Piano Style of Nat King Cole (Capitol, 1956)
 Maxwell Davis, Compositions of Duke Ellington and Others (Crown, 1960)
 Ella Fitzgerald, Get Happy! (Verve, 1959)
 Ella Fitzgerald, Ella Fitzgerald Sings the Irving Berlin Song Book Vol. 1 (Verve, 1960)
 Peggy Lee, The Man I Love (Capitol, 1957)
 Peggy Lee, Jump for Joy (Capitol, 1958)
 Frank Sinatra, Frank Sinatra Sings for Only the Lonely (Capitol, 1958)

References

Other sources
Dietrich, Kurt. Duke's Bones. Germany: Advance Music, 1995. Print.
Serrano, Basilio. "Juan Tizol: His talents, his collaborators, his legacy." Centro Journal Vol XVIII. Number 11 (2006). Print.
Mercer Ellington On Marian McPartland's Piano Jazz Mercer Ellington On Piano Jazz

External links

Juan Tizol at Music of Puerto Rico
Juan Tizol at Spaceagepop
Juan Tizol recordings at the Discography of American Historical Recordings

1900 births
1984 deaths
Swing trombonists
Puerto Rican jazz musicians
People from Vega Baja, Puerto Rico
Duke Ellington Orchestra members
20th-century trombonists